Yakovlev is a Russian aircraft designer and manufacturer.

Yakovlev may also refer to:

 Yakovlev (surname), a Russian surname
 Mount Yakovlev, a mountain in the Russkiye Mountains, Queen Maud Land, Antarctica